Alexander Niall French (born 1 December 1980) is a Hong Kong cricketer who has played two One Day Internationals and nine ICC Trophy matches for Hong Kong. French made his debut aged 16 at the 1997 ICC Trophy in Malaysia, and played four matches, scoring 22 runs with a highest score of 13 in the debut match against Italy. Despite having the third-worst batting average of the entire team — only ahead of Steven Foster and specialist bowler Mohamed Zubair — French was also in the squad for the 2001 ICC Trophy, where he managed to contribute even less. In four innings, he compiled five runs, although his off breaks also yielded three wickets — all falling in losing causes. French's batting average of 1.25 in the tournament was now the second-worst, although three wickets was the fifth-best of the team.

Though his batting performances thus far had been less than impressive, French was retained for the 2004 Asia Cup, and was even chosen to bat at number three, usually the position occupied by the best batsman. He made double figure scores against both Bangladesh and Pakistan, but it was not enough to stay in the team for the 2005 ICC Intercontinental Cup. French has also played for Cardiff UCCE, Glamorgan's Second XI, and Wales Minor Counties.

References 

 

Hong Kong One Day International cricketers
Hong Kong cricketers
1980 births
Living people
Wales National County cricketers